Jimmy Lee Gray (September 25, 1948 – September 2, 1983) was an American criminal convicted for the kidnapping, sexual assault and murder of three-year-old Deressa Jean Scales in 1976. At the time of this murder, he was free on parole after serving seven years of a 20-year-to-life sentence for the 1968 murder of his 16-year-old girlfriend, Elda Louise Prince in Parker, Arizona. Scales's parents later sued the state of Arizona for releasing Gray.

He was executed in 1983 by the state of Mississippi by gas chamber. He became the first person to be executed in Mississippi since 1976, when capital punishment was reinstated.

Dan Lohwasser, a reporter for United Press International, was one of the observers who witnessed Gray's execution. Lohwasser's account of Gray's death sparked controversy, because of the suffering that Gray exhibited. At the time of Gray's execution, the gas chamber used in Mississippi had a vertical steel pole directly behind the inmate's chair. There was no headrest or strap used to restrain Gray's head. As Gray began breathing in the toxic gas, he started thrashing his head around, striking the iron bar repeatedly before he finally lost consciousness. Officials decided to clear the observation room eight minutes after the gas had been released, because of Gray's injuries. The decision to clear the room was sharply criticized by Dennis Balske, Gray's attorney. "Jimmy Lee Gray died banging his head against a steel pole in the gas chamber while reporters counted his moans (eleven, according to the Associated Press)".

Partly due to Gray's botched execution, Mississippi passed legislation making lethal injection the only method of execution for inmates sentenced after July 1, 1984, though three more inmates (Edward Earl Johnson, Connie Ray Evans and Leo Edwards Jr.) sentenced before this date were still executed by lethal gas. Mississippi's gas chamber was decommissioned in 1998.

See also 

 Capital punishment in Mississippi
 Capital punishment in the United States
 List of botched executions
 List of people executed in Mississippi

References

Sources 
 The Death Penalty In Mississippi, Executions. Mississippi Department of Corrections. Retrieved on 2022-03-27.
 Stay Of Execution Is Continued. The New York Times (1983-07-07). Retrieved on 2007-11-12.
 Radelet, Michael L. Some Examples of Post-Furman Botched Executions . Death Penalty Information Center (2007-05-24). Retrieved on 2007-11-12.
 Gray v. Lucas, . Retrieved on 2007-11-12.
 Cabana, Donald. "Death at Midnight: The Confession of an Executioner. (Northeastern University Press, 1996), p. 7-8.

1948 births
1983 deaths
20th-century executions of American people
20th-century executions by Mississippi
American murderers of children
American rapists
American people executed for murder
Prisoners sentenced to life imprisonment by Arizona
People convicted of murder by Arizona
People convicted of murder by Mississippi
People executed by Mississippi by gas chamber
People from Whittier, California
People paroled from life sentence